Luxembourg communal council is the local council for the commune of Luxembourg City, in southern Luxembourg.

It consists of twenty-seven members, elected every six years by proportional representation.

Current composition 
The last elections were held on 9 October 2011, and resulted in a victory for the Democratic Party (DP).  In the collège échevinal, the DP forms a coalition with The Greens, who have the third-largest contingent, under the leadership of DP mayor Lydie Polfer.

2017 elections 
Below are the results of the communal elections of 8 October 2017. This council will take office in January 2018.

2005 elections

See also
 Mayor of Luxembourg City

Footnotes

External links
  Luxembourg City official website page on the council

Communal council